The Piraí River is in the state of Rio de Janeiro in southeastern Brazil.

See also
List of rivers of Rio de Janeiro

References
Brazilian Ministry of Transport

Rivers of Rio de Janeiro (state)